The Géant Glacier is a large glacier on the French side of the Mont Blanc massif in the Alps. It is the main supplier of ice (via the Vallée Blanche) to the Mer de Glace which  flows down towards Montenvers. It gets its name from the nearby Dent du Géant.

Access
It is possible to take the Vallée Blanche Cable Car which travels right over the Géant Glacier, from the Aiguille du Midi in France, to Pointe Helbronner on the Italian/French border. Experienced skiers also have an "outstanding attraction" in the challenging run from the Aiguille du Midi telepherique station, down the Vallée Blanche and onto the Géant Glacier then, avoiding the Seracs du Géant, merging onto the Mer du Glace to reach the resort of Montenvers

Early studies
In 1862, the physicist and mountaineer John Tyndall gave a series of lectures to the Royal Institution in which he reported on his studies into heat as a form of motion. By placing lines of stakes upon the ice, he made numerous measurements of ice flow from the Géant Glacier and surrounding glaciers into the Mer de Glace. He subsequently published further accounts in his 'Glaciers of the Alps.

Further reading 
 Tyndall, J. (1860?) Glaciers of the Alps

References

External links
 Geant Glacier on French IGN mapping portal

Glaciers of Metropolitan France
Glaciers of the Alps